Virandeep Singh (born 23 March 1999) is a Malaysian cricketer who plays for the Malaysia cricket team. His older brother, Pavandeep Singh, is also a Malaysian cricketer.

Career
He played for Malaysia in the 2017 ICC World Cricket League Division Three tournament in May 2017. Prior to the Division 3 tournament, he was captain of the national side for the 2016 Under-19 Asia Cup. In April 2018, he was named in Malaysia's squad for the 2018 ICC World Cricket League Division Four tournament, also in Malaysia.

In August 2018, he was named in Malaysia's squad for the 2018 Asia Cup Qualifier tournament. He was the leading run-scorer for Malaysia in the tournament, with 165 runs in five matches. In October 2018, he was named in Malaysia's squad in the Eastern sub-region group for the 2018–19 ICC World Twenty20 Asia Qualifier tournament.

In June 2019, he was named in Malaysia's squad for the 2019 Malaysia Tri-Nation Series tournament. He made his Twenty20 International (T20I) debut for Malayasia, against Thailand, on 24 June 2019. He made his List A debut for Malaysia, against Denmark, in the 2019 Malaysia Cricket World Cup Challenge League A tournament on 16 September 2019. He finished the tournament as the leading run-scorer for Malaysia, with 181 runs in five matches.

In September 2019, he was named as the captain of Malaysia's squad for their series against Vanuatu. In the opening match of the tour, at the age of 20 years and 190 days, Singh became the youngest male cricketer to captain a side in a T20I match.

References

External links
 

1999 births
Living people
Malaysian cricketers
Malaysian people of Punjabi descent
Malaysian sportspeople of Indian descent
Malaysia Twenty20 International cricketers
Place of birth missing (living people)
Southeast Asian Games gold medalists for Malaysia
Southeast Asian Games silver medalists for Malaysia
Southeast Asian Games medalists in cricket
Competitors at the 2017 Southeast Asian Games